Cuneogaster is a genus of braconid wasps in the family Braconidae. There is at least one described species in Cuneogaster, C. inae, found in the Neotropics.

References

Microgastrinae